The 1744 cricket season in England is remembered for the earliest known codification of the Laws of Cricket. This was drafted by members of several cricket clubs, though the code was not published until 1755. Much of its terminology such as no ball, over, toss, umpire and wicket remain in current use. The season is also notable for the two earliest known surviving match scorecards. The second of those matches, played on Monday, 18 June, was a celebrated event in which a Kent county team challenged an England team at the Artillery Ground, Kent winning by one wicket.

In September, Slindon Cricket Club defeated London Cricket Club and then issued a challenge to play "any parish in England". The challenge was accepted by the Addington and Bromley clubs, but there is no record of either challenge match having been completed. The single wicket form of the sport was popular and reports have survived of four top-class matches played at the Artillery Ground. Several eleven-a-side matches are the subject of surviving pre-match announcements or post-match summaries. Some reports mention crowd disturbances and efforts were made to implement control by means of admission charges and limitations on the sale of alcohol. Wagering on cricket was common and some matches are known to have been played for high stakes.

The Laws of Cricket

The earliest known coded issue of the Laws of Cricket was drafted by members of several clubs including London, of which Frederick Louis, Prince of Wales, was president. Representatives of the clubs met at the Star and Garter tavern on Pall Mall, London. The heading of the printed version, published in 1755, reads: "The Game at Cricket, As settled by the Several Cricket-Clubs, Particularly that of the Star and Garter in Pall-Mall". According to Wisden Cricketers' Almanack in 1965, these Laws were undoubtedly a recension of a much earlier code. No earlier code has been found. However, there were cases of Articles of Agreement being drawn up, as for the matches in 1727 between Charles Lennox, 2nd Duke of Richmond, and Alan Brodrick, 2nd Viscount Midleton.

Some of the main points in the 1744 code:
 the toss of a coin determines who bats first;
 the length of the pitch must be ;
 the bowling and popping creases must be cut with the popping crease exactly 3 feet ten inches before the bowling crease;
 overs last four balls;
 the no ball is the penalty for overstepping, which means the hind foot going in front of the bowling crease (i.e., in direct line of the wicket);
 various means of "it is out" are specified – they include hitting the ball twice and obstructing the field;
 the wicket-keeper is required to be still and quiet until the ball is bowled;
 umpires must allow two minutes for a new batsman to arrive and ten minutes between innings;
 the umpire cannot give a batsman out if the fielders do not appeal;
 the umpire is allowed a certain amount of discretion and it is made clear that the umpire is the "sole judge" and that "his determination shall be absolute".

There are four Laws for bowlers but they do not say he must roll the ball and there is no mention of prescribed arm action, only that he must "deliver the ball" with one foot behind the bowling crease. Rowland Bowen, writing in the 1965 edition of Wisden, asserts that the ball was bowled in the true sense (all along the ground) through the first half of the 18th century and that this was the rule prior to the 1750s, though it was largely forsaken by the 1770s after bowlers began pitching the ball.

Earliest known scorecards

The season is also notable for the two earliest known surviving match scorecards. It is not until the 1772 season that more scorecards of top-class matches have survived, although a handful of cards from minor matches have been found.

London v Surrey and Sussex, Artillery Ground, 2 June
The first, containing individual scores but no details of dismissals, is from a match between the London Cricket Club and a combined Surrey and Sussex team at the Artillery Ground on 2 June. No titles were given to the teams at the time and various titles, including London v Slindon, have been applied retrospectively by modern authors. London, whose team included given men, was the host club and their opponents were all from the counties of Surrey and Sussex. The scorecard was kept by the 2nd Duke of Richmond at Goodwood House.

The card gives the scores by each player and their surnames only, although it does differentiate between the two pairs of brothers (the Harrises and Newlands) who were playing. The Daily Advertiser carried the names of players expected to play in the match on 1–2 June and reported the same names on 3 June although some of them do not appear on the scorecard. Surrey and Sussex scored 102 runs in the first of their two innings, and 102 for 6 wickets in their second. London scored 79 in their first innings and 70 in their second so that Surrey and Sussex won by 55 runs. The highest individual score in the match was 47 by John Harris of Surrey and Sussex in the second innings. This was the first game at which tickets for readmission are known to have been issued to the spectators.

England v Kent, Artillery Ground, 18 June
Just over a fortnight later, on 18 June, the scorecard has also survived from a match at the Artillery Ground between an England team and the Kent county team. The match was arranged by Lord John Sackville who captained the Kent team. England, batting first, totalled 40 and 70 in their two innings; Kent responded with 53 and 58 for 9 to win by one wicket. Richard Newland of England made the two highest individual scores in the match with 18 not out and 15. Details of the dismissals are only partially complete; it is known that Kent bowler William Hodsoll took at least eight wickets. It is the first match for which a scorecard has survived that includes some dismissals. It became the first entry in Arthur Haygarth's Scores & Biographies, although he gave the year as 1746 instead of 1744.

The match was described by the London Daily Advertiser as the "greatest cricket match ever known". It was a noted social occasion as the spectators included the Prince of Wales and his brother, Prince William, Duke of Cumberland. Also present were the 2nd Duke of Richmond and Admiral Vernon. The poet James Love (1722–1774) commemorated it in his Cricket: An Heroic Poem (1745), written in rhyming couplets. According to cricket historian H. S. Altham, it "should be in every cricket lover's library" and "his description of the game goes with a rare swing". The poem is one of the first substantial pieces of literature about cricket – in More Than A Game, former prime minister John Major says it is the earliest-known cricket poem. Love was himself a cricketer and a member of Richmond Cricket Club in Surrey.

There was crowd disorder at the match. The Daily Advertiser reported on Saturday, 30 June that it was "with difficulty the match was played out". A decision was taken to charge sixpence admission at future matches on the Artillery Ground. Also, the field would be surrounded by a ring of benches to hold over 800 people and no one without prior authorisation would be allowed within the ring.

Slindon challenge matches

On Monday, 10 September, the London club hosted a match against Slindon Cricket Club at the Artillery Ground. Play continued into the Tuesday and, after winning the match by an unknown margin, Slindon issued a challenge to play "any parish in England" and received immediate acceptances from the Addington and Bromley clubs. These matches were arranged to take place at the Artillery Ground over the next few days and it is known that Slindon v Addington began on Wednesday, 12 September. It was impacted by bad weather and Slindon led by two runs at close of play. There are no surviving reports of play on the 13th. Slindon's match against Bromley was scheduled for Friday, 14 September, but there are no surviving reports of it taking place.

Single wicket matches
Reports have survived of four top-class matches played at the Artillery Ground under single wicket rules. This form of cricket was popular through the 1740s. On Wednesday, 13 June, there was a one-a-side match between two unnamed players "for a considerable sum of money, in order to determine finally who is the best player". On Monday, 20 August, there was another one-a-side match "for a large sum" between a Sevenoaks player and a London player.

On Monday, 17 September, a three-a-side match was billed as "Long Robin's Side v R. Newland's Side". The participants were described as the six best players in England. The teams were Robert Colchin ("Long Robin"), Val Romney and John Bryant against Richard Newland, Edward Aburrow senior and Joseph Harris. Aburrow replaced John Mills, called the "famous Kent bowler", who was originally chosen. The stake was two hundred guineas. There was another "threes" match on Monday, 1 October, again "for a considerable sum" – Robert Colchin, James Bryant and Joseph Harris played against John Bryant, Val Romney and Thomas Waymark.

Other eleven-a-side matches 

Reports have survived of three earlier matches between teams called England and Kent. Two of these took place in May at unknown venues and both were won by Kent. They later became the subject of a 1748 court case over unpaid gambling debts. The famous match on 18 June was the return to one on Friday, 15 June at Coxheath Common. Details of this match, including the result, are unknown. The Kent team challenged "eleven pick'd from any part of England".

Also in May, an England team was twice matched against Surrey. The first was played at Moulsey Hurst on Monday, 14 May, and Surrey won by four runs. The return on the 21st was played at the Artillery Ground but no details, including the result, have been found. A newspaper announcement before the second match warned spectators against encroaching onto the field of play and bringing dogs into the ground.

During the season, there were three matches which modern sources have labelled Two Elevens as each involved unnamed teams. The first of these matches took place at the Artillery Ground on Thursday, 5 July. It is known that spectators had to pay sixpence – the earliest recorded admission charge. The second match began at Moulsey Hurst on Friday, 6 July, and was unfinished. Overnight, one team led by 31 runs with two second innings wickets standing. Play continued at the Artillery Ground on the 7th with admission reduced to the "usual" twopence. Near the end of the season on Wednesday, 19 September, the Artillery Ground staged "a great match between 22 of the best players from Kent, Surrey, Sussex and London".

The prominent Addington and Bromley clubs, who accepted the Slindon challenge in September, were scheduled to play a match against each other on Friday, 13 July. No post-match reports have survived. The venue was Bromley Common where, as stated in a pre-match announcement, no person was allowed to sell liquor "but who belong to the Parish". On the previous Monday, a combined Addington and Bromley team were due to play a team called Surrey and the Rest of Kent at Duppas Hill in Croydon. A similar pre-match announcement warned that no person would be allowed to bring liquor into the ground "that don't live in the Parish". In other surviving announcements, London were to host matches at the Artillery Ground against Addington on Monday, 30 July; and against Bromley on Monday, 3 September. No post-match reports have been found.

Reports or announcements have been found of five other eleven-a-side matches which all involved London. On Monday, 9 July, they were due to play Richmond on Kennington Common but no match details have survived. London arranged a match against Woburn Cricket Club at the Artillery Ground for Thursday, 19 July, but it had to be postponed for two days because the Honourable Artillery Company required the ground. No post-match report has been found.

The other three London matches were against Surrey. They first met at Moulsey Hurst on Friday, 24 August, and London won. Robert Colchin of Bromley and Val Romney of Sevenoaks played as given men for London. The stakes for this match were reported to be "£50 a side". There was a return match the following Monday, 27th, at the Artillery Ground and London with Colchin and Romney were again the winners. A third match was scheduled at the Artillery Ground for Friday, 7 September with Romney playing for London but no post-match details are known.

References

Bibliography

Further reading
 
 

1744 in England
1744 in sports
English cricket seasons in the 18th century